The SAI KZ III Laerke was a Danish light utility aircraft used by the Danish Air Ambulance Service and Danish Air Force.

The first KIII was built during the German occupation of Denmark and first flew on 11 September 1944. With German permission it was transferred to the Redningskorpset (Rescue Service). A second war-time example was smuggled to Sweden. The two wartime aircraft had  Gypsy Major I engines.

The KIII had a high wing braced by V-struts to the lower fuselage. Its fuselage had a steel tube structure and, like the rest of the aircraft, had fabric covering. Its two front seats shared dual controls. Slotted  flaps and fixed, full span slots provided a gentle stall.

64 were built post-war with  Blackburn Cirrus Minor II engines. Many of these went to flying clubs, mostly in Denmark but with sales to several near-by countries. A few went further, one to Singapore and another to India, where its airframe still survives.

Operators

Civil operators

 Danish Air Ambulance Service

Military operators

 Royal Danish Air Force.

Specifications

See also

References

Further reading

External links

Profile at The Danish Collection of Vintage Aircraft

1940s Danish civil utility aircraft
Skandinavisk Aero Industri aircraft
Single-engined tractor aircraft
High-wing aircraft
Aircraft first flown in 1944